The list of Olympic men's ice hockey players for West Germany consisted of 68 skaters and 10 goaltenders. Men's ice hockey tournaments have been staged at the Olympic Games since 1920 (it was introduced at the 1920 Summer Olympics, and was permanently added to the Winter Olympic Games in 1924). West Germany participated in six tournaments, the first in 1968 and the last in 1988. Before 1968 and after 1988 West Germany had participated as part of a unified German team. West Germany's best finish was third overall, winning a bronze medal at the 1976 Winter Olympics, while their lowest finish was tenth place in 1980.

Erich Kühnhackl has scored the most goals, with 16, assists, 16, and has the most points, 32. Udo Kiessling has competed in the most Olympics, appearing in four tournaments with West Germany (and one with Germany), and has played the most games of any skater, with 25.

Four players, Dieter Hegen, Udo Kiessling, Erich Kühnhackl, and Alois Schloder have been inducted into the International Ice Hockey Federation Hall of Fame, though all have been inducted under Germany.



Key

Goaltenders

Skaters

References

Notes

Citations

References

 
 
 
 
 
 

Ice hockey
West Germany
West Germany